Bahary is a neighborhood in Alexandria, Egypt.

See also 

 Neighborhoods in Alexandria

Populated places in Alexandria Governorate
Neighbourhoods of Alexandria